January 2011 North American blizzard can refer to:

January 8–13, 2011 North American blizzard
January 25–27, 2011 North American blizzard